Patriarch Mark V may refer to:

 Patriarch Mark V of Alexandria, Greek Patriarch of Alexandria in 1425–1435
 Pope Mark V of Alexandria, Pope of Alexandria & Patriarch of the See of St. Mark in 1603–1619